An Alternate Employer Organization (AEO) is a human resource services firm targeting small and medium sized business (typically less than 250 employees).  AEO offerings include payroll processing, payroll tax filing, workers’ compensation insurance, health benefits, employers’ practice and liability insurance, and workforce management technology, training and development.

Background on PEO model 
Similar in nature to employee leasing companies, PEOs emerged in the 1980s to fill a demand in the marketplace for a more robust menu of HR services than just employee staffing. PEOs proposed to take on the responsibility of performing a wide array of administrative tasks for businesses and managing state and federal regulatory compliance.

Under the PEO model, upon entering into a services contract with a client-employer business, the PEO becomes the employer of record for tax purposes—filing paperwork (payroll, taxes, insurance, etc.) under its own tax identification number(s).  As the legal employer, the PEO is responsible for withholding proper taxes, paying unemployment insurance taxes and providing workers’ compensation coverage.  The “co-employment” relationship allows the “client-employer” to remain focused on the core elements of its business and its employees’ day-to-day activities.

PEOs are regulated at the state level. The PEO model is still beneficial and heavily utilized by many businesses, though some grapple with transparency-related obstacles with respect to federal payroll tax obligations. In sum, because that the PEO (through use of its own Employer Identification Number) serves as the party responsible for interfacing with and reporting to the Federal Internal Revenue Service, only the PEO receives notice regarding any tax payment discrepancies.  Recognizing this dynamic, some client-employers have advocated for increased transparency and have voiced a preference to be included in any IRS-related communications should tax issues arise. (See Proponent Testimony on Ohio SB 201). In response to this feedback and other comments from the business community, Ohio lawmakers established the Alternate Employer Organization ("AEO") model, which is almost identical to a PEO, but allows client-employers to interface directly with the IRS by including their own tax identification number in relevant IRS filings (rather than the tax identification number of the PEO).

Ohio establishes AEO option 
Developed by Cleveland, Ohio-based Company (and former PEO) Minute Men Select and its CEO Jay Lucarelli, the first-of-its-kind AEO HR services entity operates very much like a PEO, except that it files client-employer payroll taxes under the tax identification number (EIN) of the client-employer business, rather than the PEO itself.  Entities choosing this option will still be licensed by the Ohio Bureau of Workers’ Compensation, but will be identified as Alternate Employer Organizations under state law.  Like PEOs, the AEO entity remains liable for payment of taxes and wages and may self-insure for purposes of Ohio workers’ compensation.  The only difference from PEO model is that the AEO must file payroll taxes under the client-employer’s Federal EIN (thereby allowing the client-employer to receive IRS tax-related communications).

References

Economy of Ohio